Elze is a town in the district of Hildesheim, in Lower Saxony, Germany. The municipality of Elze also comprises the villages of Esbeck, Mehle, Sehlde, Sorsum, Wittenburg and Wülfingen.

The emperor also founded a missionary diocese here, dedicated to Saints Peter and Paul which became the origin of the Bishopric of Hildesheim. King Louis the Pious relocated the episcopal see to Hildesheim in 815, however the Lutheran parish church is still devoted to Peter and Paul and the saints are also depicted in the town's coat of arms.

The village of Wittenburg is the site of a former Augustininan canons regular monastery, established in the 14th century in the place of a former castle, maybe erected by members of the Billung dynasty as early as 805. The abbey decayed in the course of the Protestant Reformation, while the Gothic monastery church is preserved.

In 1856 the Kingdom of Hanover opened the Hanoverian Southern Railway (Hannöversche Südbahn) from Hanover to Kassel with a station in Elze. After the annexation by Prussia in 1866, the town became an important railway junction with the building of the Elze–Löhne railway (Weserbahn) to Löhne in Westphalia by entrepreneur Bethel Henry Strousberg, finished in 1875. Elze is also the junction of the Bundesstraße 1 and Bundesstraße 3 federal highways.

Notable people
 Justus Gesenius (1601-1673), Lutheran theologian
 Johann Heinrich Louis Krüger (1857-1923), mathematician
 Philipp Furtwängler, (1800-1867), organ builder, 
 Philipp Furtwängler, (1869-1940), mathematician (number theorist)
 Günter Halm, (born 1922), bearer of the Knight's Cross and Order of Merit of the Federal Republic of Germany

Twin town
 Écouché, France since 1972

References 

Towns in Lower Saxony
Hildesheim (district)